Cyclohexanedione may refer to:

 1,2-Cyclohexanedione
 1,3-Cyclohexanedione
 1,4-Cyclohexanedione